Acalolepta mausoni is a species of beetle in the family Cerambycidae. It was described by Stephan von Breuning in 1954. It is known from Vietnam.

References

Acalolepta
Beetles described in 1954